Stockholm East, or Stockholm Östra, may refer to:

 Stockholm East Station, a railway terminus in Stockholm, Sweden
 Stockholm East (film), a film set in Stockholm East Station and starring Mikael Persbrandt and Iben Hjejle